Phil Louis Henny (born 31 January 1943, Montagny-près-Yverdon, Switzerland) is a racing mechanic, driver, and author.

Career 

In 1964 he modified a Jaguar E for Swiss driver Maurice Caillet, competing in the FIA Endurance races. In 1965 he toured Europe Formula 2 Championship with French driver Bernard Collomb. In 1966 worked for the Scuderia Filipinetti as a crew chief on the Ford GT40 driven by Peter Sutclife and Dieter Spoerry at the 24 Hours of Le Mans. In 1967 joined Carroll Shelby racing team and was one of the mechanic participating in the construction of the Ford MK IV, that won Le Mans in 1967, driven by Dan Gurney and A. J. Foyt.

From 1969 until 1976, Phil participated in 19 races with SCCA and IMSA.  Driving sports cars, Formula 5000, and GT cars. He raced in the Daytona 24 Hours in 1976. In 1973, Phil Founded Drysumpsystems Inc. manufacturing oiling systems adaptable to race cars such as NASCAR, CanAm, TransAm and Formula 5000.

In 2004, Phil released his first book relating his story while working in the sixties at Shelby American.

Published works 

 Just call me Carroll (2004, Editions Cotty)
 Appelle moi Carroll (2005, Editions du Palmier)
 Appelle moi Carroll (2013, Editions Cotty)
 Bob Bondurant America's uncrowned World Driving Champion (2007, Editions Cotty)
 Bob Bondurant Des Cobra à la Formule1 la meme passion (2008, Editions Cotty)
 Nenn mich einfach Carroll (2009,  Editions Cotty)
 Al Bartz Engine Man (2011, Editions Cotty)
 Build your own Cobra (2013, Editions Cotty)
 Dave MacDonald – Cobra Man (2018 The will to Win Editions) Cotty.
 Dan Gurney – Nostalgie (2019 English Editions) Cotty.

References

External links 
 Phil's website
  Phil's interview "Just call me Carroll" book

Swiss racing drivers
24 Hours of Daytona drivers
Trans-Am Series drivers
1943 births
Living people
People from Yverdon-les-Bains
Sportspeople from the canton of Vaud